Snelling & St. Clair is a bus rapid transit station on the Metro A Line in Saint Paul, Minnesota.

The station is located at the intersection of St. Clair Avenue on Snelling Avenue. Both station platforms are located north of St. Clair Avenue.

The station opened June 11, 2016 with the rest of the A Line.

Bus connections
 Route 70 - St. Clair Avenue - West 7th Street - Burns Avenue - Sunray Transit Center
 Route 84 - Snelling Avenue - Highland Village - Sibley Plaza
Connections to local bus Route 70 can be made on St. Clair Avenue. Route 84 shares platforms with the A Line.

Notable places nearby
Macalester College
Macalester-Groveland, Saint Paul

References

External links 
 Metro Transit: Snelling & St. Clair Station

Bus stations in Minnesota